Chamber Music is a 1925 German silent drama film directed by Carl Froelich and starring Henny Porten, Ida Wüst, Harry Halm, and Ferdinand von Alten.

The film's art direction was by Franz Schroedter.

Cast

References

Bibliography

External links

1925 films
Films of the Weimar Republic
Films directed by Carl Froelich
German silent feature films
German black-and-white films